Mary Duke Biddle Estate, also known as the James O. Cobb House, is a historic home and estate located at Durham, Durham County, North Carolina. The main house "Pinecrest" is a Tudor Revival style dwelling built in 1927, with additions and interior renovations made between 1935 and 1958.  These additions and renovations included Colonial Revival, French Eclectic, Oriental, Art Moderne, and Art Deco elements. The estate property includes an additional three contributing outbuildings and nine contributing structures. They are The Cottage, a gasoline pump, iron picket fence with two ornamental gates, two large brick arches, stone-lined grottoes, bathhouse, tennis court, a swimming pool, a stone fireplace, pergola, a gardener's cottage with an attached greenhouse, and a storage garage.  The estate was the home of philanthropist Mary Duke Biddle from 1935 until her death in 1960.

After Mary Duke Biddle's death, the house was owned by noted philanthropist Mary Duke Biddle Trent Semans and her husband, James H. Semans, who gave the house to their son, James D.B.T. Semans in 1976.

It was listed on the National Register of Historic Places in 2013.  Pinecrest and some of the contributing resources are included in the Forest Hills Historic District.

References

Houses on the National Register of Historic Places in North Carolina
Tudor Revival architecture in North Carolina
Modern Movement architecture in the United States
Duke family residences
Biddle family residences
Houses completed in 1927
Houses in Durham, North Carolina
National Register of Historic Places in Durham County, North Carolina
Historic district contributing properties in North Carolina